The Sangam landscape (Tamil: அகத்திணை "inner classification") is the name given to a poetic device that was characteristic of love poetry in classical Tamil Sangam literature. The core of the device was the categorisation of poems into different tiṇais or modes, depending on the nature, location, mood and type of relationship represented by the poem. Each tiṇai was closely associated with a particular landscape, and imagery associated with that landscape—its flowers, trees, wildlife, people, climate and geography—was woven into the poem in such a way as to convey a mood, associated with one aspect of a romantic relationship.

Symbolism 

Classical Tamil love poetry assigns the human experiences it describes, and in particular the subjective topics that those experiences relate to, to specific habitats. Every situation in the poems is described using themes in which the time, the place and the floral symbols of each episode are codified. These codifications are used as symbols to imply a socio-economic order, occupations and behaviour patterns, which, in turn, are symbolized, by specific flora and fauna. Details of secondary aspects are just as rigidly codified—the seasons, the hour a god, musical instruments and, above all, the sentimental connotations of each landscape: lovers' meetings, patient waiting, lovers' quarrels, separation, and the anxiously awaited return.

Geographical and non-geographical thinais 

Under this codification, the inner universe associated with love is divided into seven modes, or thinai, five of which are geographical and associated with specific landscapes, and two of which are non-geographical and not associated with any specific landscape. Four of the geographical landscapes are described as being landscapes that occur naturally in the Tamil lands. These are: kuṟiñci (குறிஞ்சி)—mountainous regions, associated with union, mullai (முல்லை)—forests, associated with waiting, marutam (மருதம்)—cropland, associated with quarreling, and neital (நெய்தல்)—seashore, associated with pining.  The fifth—pālai (பாலை), or desert, associated with separation—is described in the Tolkappiyam as not being a naturally existing landscape.

From these basic associations of landscape and subject, a wide range of specific themes suitable for each landscape were derived.  Thus, for example, the commentary on the Iraiyanar Akapporul states that as a result of the association of the kuṟiñci landscape with union, it was also associated with the fear of separation, reassurance, the hero's or heroine's discussions with their friends, their being teased or taunted by their friends, their replies to their friends, the friends' role as intermediary, the meeting of the lovers, grief and doubt, and other similar themes.  According to the Tamilneri vilakkam, a 9th-century text on poetry, the love themes described by the five thinais constitute "the Tamil way of life" or "the Tamil way of love" (tamiḻneṟi).

The two non-geographical modes—kaikkilai and peruntiṇai—were seen as dealing with emotions that were non-conforming, and therefore were not associated with any specific landscape.  Kaikkilai, dealt with unreciprocated or one-sided love, while peruntiṇai, dealt with 'improper' love or love against the rules of custom.

Poetic Attributes of the Landscapes

The Geographical thinais 
In Tamil, each of the five geographical thinais are named for a flower that is characteristic of that landscape.  In English translation, however, it is customary to use the name of the landscape rather than that of the flower, largely because the flowers lack the cultural association with a specific language in English that they have in Tamil.

Kurinji—Mountainous Region 

The mountain is the scene of the lovers' union at midnight. It is the cold, dewy season. The forest is rich with lakes, waterfalls, teak, bamboo and sandalwood. In this region millet grows and wild bees are a source of honey.
Love in this setting is exemplified by Murugan, and one of his wives, Valli, the daughter of a mountain dweller. He wears the sparkling red kantal flower and rides a peacock, the bird of the mountains.

The name of the region, Kurinchi, is also the name of the famous Kurinji flower (Strobilanthes kunthiana) from the lofty hills of Tamil country. The Strobilanthes, a shrub whose brilliant white flowers blossom for only a few days once every ten or twelve years, blanketing the slopes in radiant whiteness under the sun. This event of jubilation and purity symbolizes the frenzy of a sudden love shared, in concert with the unleashed forces of nature: the amorous dance of peacocks, their echoing cries, the splash of waterfalls, the roar of savage beasts. The lovers hold each other tighter still and forget the dangers of the mountain path.

The people of this region were known by the names kanavar, vedar and kuravar whose prime occupation was hunting, honey harvesting and millet cultivation. The Vedars or Vettuvars (derived from vettai - hunting) were the main hunters, kanavars (derived from kanam - forest) hunted elephants and pigs, the kuravars or kunravar (derived from kunru - hill) were forest cultivators. Their headmen were known as Verpan, Poruppan and Silamban. Their totems included Murugan (god of war and hunting, under the name Seyyon), the Vel (spear of Murugan), the tiger and the tree Venkai. Their settlements were known as sirukuti and their place-names attached the suffixes kuricci (hilly village) and malai (hill).

Mullai—Forests 

Mullai is the land of the forest. The forest is rich with lakes, waterfalls, teak, bamboo and sandalwood. In this region millet grows and wild bees are a source of honey. Mullai or Jasmine (Jasminum auriculatum) is the flower of the forests. The inhabitants were known as kovalar, ayar and idaiyar, whose occupation included livestock, shifting cultivation, husbandry and dairy farming. The kovalars  were cowherder and the ayar were pastoralist involved in cattle herding. Their settlements were known as pāti and seven nrega  the suffixes patti, vati, katu and ental attached to their place-names. Their headmen bore the titles kon, Annal, Tonral, Kuramporai,  and headwomen as Manaivi.

The theme of the forest and of shepherds at play, the image of confident waiting for the loved one, produced an original offshoot; for this is the region of Maayon (Ancient Tamil god), and the love theme it represents symbolizes the devotee waiting in the hope that Maayon will eventually come and fill his soul, thus experiencing the joys of expectation.

{| border="1" align="center" cellpadding=4 cellspacing="0" width="600" style="margin: 0 0 1em 1em; background: #fafafa; border: 1px #aaaaaa solid; border-collapse: collapse; font-size: 95%;"
|style="width:300px"|
முல்லை—தலைவி கூற்று

சுடர்செல் வானஞ் சேப்பப் படர்கூர்ந் 
தெல்லறு பொழுதின் முல்லை மலரும் 
மாலை என்மனார் மயங்கி யோரே 
குடுமிக் கோழி நெடுநக ரியம்பும் 
பெரும்புலர் விடியலு மாலை 
பகலும் மாலை துணையி லோர்க்கே.

—மிளைப்பெருங் கந்தனார்.
|style="width:300px"|
The sun goes down and the sky reddens, pain grows sharp,
light dwindles. Then is evening
when jasmine flowers open, the deluded say.
But evening is the great brightening dawn
when crested cocks crow all through the tall city
and evening is the whole day
for those without their lovers.

(Kuruntokai-234)' tr. George L. Hart
|}

 Marutham—Cropland 

The plains were the scene of triangular love plots in which the hero's visits to the courtesan oblige the heroine to counter with a mixed show of coquetry and moodiness, tactics whose limits are described in the Thirukkural ("Sulking is like flavouring with salt; a little suffices, but it is easy to go too far."). Senon, the god of thunderstorm, is the god of Marutham land. The inhabitants were known as ulavar, velanmadar, toluvar and kadaiyar or kadasiyan   whose occupations were involved in agriculture. The ulavar were the ploughers, the velanmadar and toluvar the tillers and the kadaiyars were the farmworkers. Their headmen were known as Mahinan, Uran and Manaiyol. Their settlements were known as perur and their place-names often had the suffixes eri, kulam, mankalam and kudi.The Marutam (Lagerstroemia speciosa) tree was the characteristic tree of this region.

 Neithal—Seashore 

The seashore affords many examples of the compelling charm of Sangam poetry and the extraordinary freshness of its realism. From behind the conventional symbolization of waiting there emerges a picture of the life of the fisherfolk; the nets and boats drawn up on the beach, scuttling crabs and cart wheels bogged down in the sand, the odour of drying fish, cut into thick slices, which attracts the birds, beautiful village girls peering through the Pandanus hedges, and the wind blowing through the cracks in the roughly constructed straw huts at night. Kadalon, the water god, is worshiped in Neithal. The inhabitants were known as parathavar, nulaiyar and umanar whose occupations included fishing, coastal trade, pearl diving and salt manufacturing. The parathavars were sailors and fishermen, the nulaiyar were the divers and umanars the salt manufacturers and merchants. Their settlements were known as pakkam or pattinam, which were maritime trading ports. The headmen were known as Thuraivan, Pulampan and Serppan.

The neithal, or water lily is the characteristic flower of the region.

 Pālai—Dry Lands 

In classical Tamil prosody, the pālai or wasteland is not seen as being a naturally occurring ecology. Ilampuranar, in his commentary on the Tolkappiyam, explains that instead, the landscape of the wasteland with which the paalai is associated emerges when other landscapes whither under the heat of the burning sun.
The palai flower is identified as Wrightia (Wrightia tinctoria). The people inhabiting this region are known as eyiner, maravar and kalvar who were involved in waylaying, highway robbery and soldiering. The Eyiner (from ey – bow) were hunters who hunted with bow, the maravar (from maram – valour) were soldiers and the kalvar (from kal – robbery) were robbers. Their chiefs were known as mili, vitalai and kalai. Their settlements were known as kurumpu. Kotravai, the Mother goddess and goddess of war, is worshipped here.

The theme of wasteland and separation occupies half of one of the most famous anthologies, the theme of the mountain being only secondary.

References

 Gros, Francois,  Poetry in a landscape; the world of Sangam - Indian literature,  UNESCO Courier,  March 1984.
 Kaḷaiviyal eṉṟa Iṟaiyaṉār Akapporuḷ. South India Saiva Siddhanta Works Publishing Society Ltd., Madras: 1976.
 Tolkappiyam porulatikāram, iḷampūraṇar uraiyuṭaṉ''.  Vol 1: akattiṇaiyiyal, puṟattiṇaiyiyal. South India Saiva Siddhanta Works Publishing Society Ltd., Chennai: 2000.

Tamil poetics
Tamil-language literature
Tamil philosophy
Cultural history of Tamil Nadu